Mahmoud Fotouhi Firouzabad (born 1959) is the former president of Sharif University of Technology, serving from 28 August 2014 to 18 October 2021 . Fotouhi Firouzabad earned his BSc in electrical engineering with honours from Sharif University of Technology. He was subsequently admitted into the graduate program of the University of Tehran where he received an MSc.

He was awarded a scholarship from Iranian Ministry of Science to pursue his studies in University of Saskatchewan in Canada, where he completed MSc and PhD degrees from the University of Saskatchewan.

His scientific activities include more than 150 journals papers, and supervising more than 50 masters and doctoral theses. He has become the IEEE  Fellow since 2014.

References

External links 
Official website - Sharif University of Technology

University of Saskatchewan alumni
Academic staff of Sharif University of Technology
1959 births
Living people
Chancellors of the Sharif University of Technology
Fellow Members of the IEEE